Matti Rajakylä (born August 14, 1984 in Kirkkonummi, Finland) is a former freestyle and butterfly swimmer from Finland. He has hold several Finnish national records in both long course and short course. He participated in the Summer Olympics in Athens 2004 and Beijing 2008.

Rajakylä's achievements include the bronze in the 50 m freestyle at the European Junior Championships in Linz, Austria in 2002, the bronze in the 4×50 m medley relay at the European Short Course Swimming Championships in Wien, Austria in 2004 and the bronze in the 50 m butterfly at the European SC Championships in Trieste, Italy in 2005 with a time of 23.17. Rajakylä finished third in the semi-finals of 50m butterfly at the European LC Championships 2006 in Budapest, Hungary, but was left on sixth position in the finals.

In December, at the European Short Course Swimming Championships 2006 in Helsinki, Finland, Rajakylä managed to achieve silver medal status in the men's 4 x 50m medley relay. He came in last in each of his personal finals.

In April 2009 Rajakylä announced that he quits his swimming career.

Records 
Rajakylä has hold Finnish national records in following events:

Rajakylä has also set the world record for the 24-hour swim along with other Finnish swimmers in September 2005.

Personal life 
After his retirement from the sport, Rajakylä met Indian Hindu spiritual leader Amma in Finland in 2009, which led him to live in an ashram in Kerala, India, from six to nine months per year from 2011 to 2017. Rajakylä works as a swimming coach, and he lives in Santa Cruz, California, with his American wife whom he had met in the ashram.

References

External links

1984 births
Living people
Swedish-speaking Finns
Finnish male freestyle swimmers
Finnish male butterfly swimmers
Olympic swimmers of Finland
Swimmers at the 2004 Summer Olympics
Swimmers at the 2008 Summer Olympics
People from Kirkkonummi
Expatriates in India
Finnish expatriate sportspeople in the United States
Sportspeople from Uusimaa